Algebra Felicia Blessett (born April 9, 1976), usually known as Algebra Blessett or just Algebra, is an American contemporary R&B singer.

Early life
Blessett's mother was a gospel singer and bass player, and Blessett grew up to the sounds of soul music, gospel and R&B. Like many R&B singers, she sang in a gospel choir when she was in school. However, she was not passionate about the experience, and decided to do it only because she was not good at sports, but still wanted to stay after school with her friends.

Music career
Blessett started doing background vocals, among others for R&B artists Monica and Bilal. This earned her a contract with Rowdy Records in Atlanta. She has toured with Anthony Hamilton, and collaborated with India.Arie. At a later age she learned to play the guitar, and started to do her own gigs in the Atlanta club scene. She writes her own songs.

Blessett released her first single, "U Do It For Me", on the Kedar Entertainment label in 2006. She released her first album, Purpose, in 2008.

In 2014, her sophomore effort Recovery was released.

Charts
Blessett's debut album Purpose was on the US Billboard R&B chart for 14 weeks, and reached No. 56. It also landed No. 37 on Heatseekers Albums.

Her second album, Recovery, was her debut on the Billboard 200, charting No. 149. It also entered No. 2 on Heatseekers Albums and No. 23 on Top R&B/Hip-Hop Albums.

Discography

Albums

Singles
2006: "U Do It For Me"
2008: "Run and Hide"
2012: "Black Gold" – credited as 'Esperanza Spalding with Algebra Blessett'
2013: "Nobody But You"

References

External links
2 Algebra pictures, Vibe Magazine Gallery, retrieved September 26, 2009
Algebra on NeoSoulVille, retrieved September 26, 2009
Algebra Blessett on Myspace

1976 births
Living people
Musicians from Atlanta
Songwriters from Georgia (U.S. state)
American contemporary R&B singers
21st-century American women singers
21st-century American singers
American neo soul singers